Mooncusser Films, LLC is the film and video production company founded by documentary producer/director Christopher Seufert. Notable projects include cinema verité films with alterna-folk musician Suzanne Vega, the late illustrator Edward Gorey, and one upcoming portrait of legendary filmmaker Albert Maysles. Mooncusser Films has provided content to PBS, the Discovery Channel, VH-1, Twin Cities Public Television, and the History Channel.

Director Christopher Seufert is most known for his award-winning educational film series about the Cape Cod dayboat fishing industry in New England.

He also worked with actress Julie Harris, veteran journalist Walter Cronkite, and with musician Chris Trapper of the Push Stars.
Mooncusser Films Walter Cronkite Project
Mooncusser Films Official Web Site
Mooncusser Films Suzanne Vega Documentary
Documentary with filmmaker Albert Maysles
Article at NewEnglandFilm.com
Mooncusser Films Edward Gorey Documentary

Film production companies of the United States